Klamath Falls City School District is a public school district serving Klamath Falls, Oregon, United States.

Demographics
In the 2009 school year, the district had 249 students classified as homeless by the Department of Education, or 6.3% of students in the district.

Schools

High schools
Klamath Union High School
Klamath Learning Center
Pelican Transition (SPED students ages 18-21)
Eagle Ridge High School (charter school)

Middle school
Ponderosa Middle School

Elementary schools
Conger Elementary
Mills Elementary
Pelican Elementary
Roosevelt Elementary
Klamath Home Learning Academy

See also
List of school districts in Oregon

References

External links
 

Klamath Falls, Oregon
School districts in Oregon
Education in Klamath County, Oregon